Newtown is a part of the Municipality of New-Wes-Valley, located at the North end of Bonavista Bay in the province of Newfoundland and Labrador, Canada. The approximate population is 400. Settlement in Newtown originated around 1850 when people relocated from nearby areas. Newtown is well known for being built on many small islands, and is the home of the Barbour Living Heritage Village.

History
Newtown was once known as Inner Pinchard's Island or Inner Islands because of its close proximity to Pinchard's Island, where most of Newtown's settlers first came from. The first family names recorded in Newtown were the Blackmores, Halls, and Norris'. Newtown was combined with Pinchard's Island in the Newfoundland Census until the 1874 Census. In 1884 there were 382 people living in Newtown, mainly working in the Labrador fishery and the seal fishery. In 1892 the operator of the local lobster factory, John Haddon, announced the community was changing its name to Newtown. However, the name of the post office remained Inner Islands until 1903. With the collapse of the Labrador fishery in the 1930s, the population began to decline. The population in 1921 was 632 but by 1940 it was almost half, at 359. After several years and with people leaving smaller nearby areas, many people moved to Newtown and the population began to grow again. In 1992 the community of Newtown amalgamated with Wesleyville and Badger's Quay-Valleyfield-Pool's Island.

Church history
A Church of England school-chapel was built by 1880 in Newtown and a Methodist school-chapel opened in 1885. In 1884 124 of the 382 people in Newtown were Methodist, in 1889 there were 160 Methodists and by 1921 there were 275 Methodists. St.Luke's Church of England church was consecrated in Newtown in 1895, and Newtown became the center of church life for surrounding communities with the establishment of the Methodist circuit there in 1912.

Education history
The first record of schooling in Newtown was with a Mrs. Collins, who kept a school for those who could not go to Pinchard's Island, in 1878. A Church of England school-chapel was constructed in 1889 and a Methodist one by 1885.

The Barbour Family
Two of the early Barbers/Barbours in Newfoundland, George (1746–1818) and Joseph (1751–1818) Barbour  arrived in Greenspond sometime prior to 1792, and later settled on Cobbler's Island after 1809. Joseph's son Benjamin Barbour (1808–1891) had eleven children. Five of them, Joseph, William, Thomas, George and James, were well-known sealing captains. Edward and Samuel formed the E&S Barbour firm. The Barbours came to Newtown in the early 1870s, upon which time some of them became sealing captains. The first was Captain Joe Barbour (1842–1890) and the most prominent being Captain George Barbour (1858–1928). George Barbour was born on Cobbler's Island and his first steamer was the Walrus in 1893, and his last was the Beothic II in 1928. Although Captain George Barbour had many successes, he was also faced with some tragedy. The Greenland Disaster of 1898 cost the lives of several of George Barbours men. The names of those men from Pinchard's Island and Newtown were: George Bungay, James Cheeks, Isaac Green, George Norris, Herbert Norris, Walter Norris, Kenneth Parsons, and Henry Curtis.

Because of Benjamin Barbour and Sons and E&S Barbour firm (established 1893), Newtown became an important mercantile center. The Barbour family of Newtown, through their efforts and successes, brought much to the community of Newtown in its early years and continues to do so today. The Barbour House in Newtown was constructed in 1874 by Benjamin Barbour, a schooner-owner and master-mariner. It has 32 rooms and is an important tourist attraction in Newtown today.

Census information
The 1869 Census includes both Pinchard's Island and Inner Island (Newtown). Newtown appears in the 1874 Census as Pinchard's Island Inner Tickles.

Directory information
- Newtown appears in Lovell's Directory for 1871 as "Inner Islands" and is described as a group of islands on the north side of Bonavista Bay which is difficult to access. It is distant from Greenspond by 10 miles in boat and has a population of 141. The names listed are:
Benjamin Barbour, Planter
Patrick Blackmore, Fisherman
William Bungey, Fisherman
Edward Efferton, Planter
John Efferton, Planter
John Hall, Planter
Leon Norrys, Planter
James Parsons, Fisherman
Mrs. Orpha Parsons, Widow
Thomas Perry, Fisherman
Francis Sainsburry, Planter
George Sainsburry, Planter
John Sainsburry, Planter
John Tulk, Planter
James Way, Fisherman

See also
 List of communities in Newfoundland and Labrador
 Bonavista Bay
 Bonavista Peninsula
 Newfoundland (island)
 Newfoundland and Labrador

References

External links
 Alphaeus Barbour House

''Research on this page has been contributed by the Greenspond Historical Society.

Former towns in Newfoundland and Labrador
Populated coastal places in Canada
Populated places in Newfoundland and Labrador